"Jane Doe" is the title of the debut single recorded by Minami Takahashi. It was released on April 3, 2013. The A-side is used as theme song for the Japanese drama Saki. The single was released in four versions, three CD Maxi+DVD editions and a limited theater edition.

The song is a rock ballad written from a male perspective, depicted as being in a relationship he can't resist falling in love with one woman even after being disrespected, deceived by her and finally losing everything. The tracks follow the A-side upbeat feel, except for the ballads "Yabureta Hane" and Type C exclusive track, "Migikata", originally a song from Atsuko Maeda's second single Kimi wa Boku da.

Track listing
All lyrics written by Yasushi Akimoto.

Type A

Type B

Type C

Theater edition

Charts

The single sold 45,645 copies on the first day of release and 85,493 copies in the first week of release.

References 

2013 debut singles
Universal Music Japan singles
Japanese television drama theme songs
Songs with lyrics by Yasushi Akimoto
2013 songs